This list consists of people who reached the summit of Mount Everest more than once. By 2013, 6,871 summits have been recorded by 4,042 people. Despite two hard years of disaster (2014 and 2015),  by the end of 2016 there were 7,646 summits by 4,469 people. In 2018 about 800 people summited, breaking the record for most in one year compared to 2013, in which 667 summited Mount Everest.

As of July 2022, there have been approximately 11,346 summit ascents by 6,098 people.

Note all information may not be completed/updated, it can take months and even years to update summit counts as confirmed by sources

List

Verification issues
Cases of possible confusion over names, sources, or unclear references

Adventure Consultants report on summits and people by 2016:
Da Jangbu Sherpa, Nepal, 13 summits
Pemba Chhoti Sherpa, Nepal, 11 summit
Kami Rita Sherpa, Nepal, 14 summits
Purba Chhoter Sherpa (Ang Jangbu), 8 summits
Chhewang Dorji Sherpa, Nepal, 9 summits
Chhiring (Tsering) Namgel Sherpa, Nepal, 4 summits
Da Thuk Bhote, Nepal, 3 summits
Passang Bhote, 7 summits
Nima Tsering, Nepal, 6 summits

It can be hard to determine who is who sometimes, as there are some similar names. For example in 2013 two different Kami Rita Sherpa high-altitude workers summited with different guide firms. Nepal may not issue summit certificates to Nepali who don't buy a permit. One problem firms must contend with is summit fraud attempts.

See also
List of Mount Everest records
List of 20th-century summiters of Mount Everest
List of people who died climbing Mount Everest

Notes

References

8000er Statistics by Eberhard Jurgalski (Everest)
Himalayan Database (2004-2014)

External links
Adventurestats.com Summits 1953-2001
UBC expedition seeks high altitude answers to chronic diseases
ESA - Summiters - USA (sorts by nation, goes to about 2009)
Page 4 has summit count list from 2009

Mount Everest
+
Climbing and mountaineering-related lists
Mount Everest